Muçolli is an Albanian surname. Notable people with the surname include:

 Agon Muçolli (born 1998), Danish footballer
 Arbnor Mucolli (born 1999), Danish-Albanian football player
 Erza Muqoli (born 2003), French singer

Albanian-language surnames